Mauch is a German surname. Notable people with the surname include:

Billy and Bobby Mauch, (1921 – 2006 and 1921 – 2007),  American child actors
Christof Mauch (born 1960), German historian
Cody Mauch (born 1999), American football player
Corine Mauch (born 1960), Swiss politician
Daniel Mauch (c. 1477 – 1540), German sculptor
Fritz C. Mauch (1905-1940), German film editor
Gene Mauch (1925–2005), American baseball player and manager
Hans Mauch (1906–1984), German aerospace engineer
Hans-Rudi Mauch (1919–1979), of the figure-skating duo Frick and Frack
Karl Mauch (1837–1875), German explorer and geographer
Loy Mauch, (born 1952), American politician
Monika Mauch, German opera singer
Paul Mauch (1897–1924), German footballer
Richard Mauch (1874 –1921) was an Austrian painter and illustrator
Thomas Mauch (born 1937), German cinematographer and film producer

German-language surnames